Stoos is a village located in the municipality of Morschach.

It is used as a small ski resort with a cable car leading to the Fronalpstock. The village is car-free and is accessible via the Stoosbahn funicular railway. 

The Swiss Olympic skier Hedi Beeler was born here.

References

External links 
https://stoos-muotatal.ch

Ski areas and resorts in Switzerland
Villages in Switzerland
Car-free villages in Switzerland